Geranium is a Danish gourmet restaurant, situated in Parken in the center of Copenhagen. The head chef is the Danish chef Rasmus Kofoed, who won the Bocuse d'Or in 2011. It was one of the first Danish three-starred restaurants according to the Michelin Guide. In 2022, it was named best restaurant in the world by The World’s 50 Best Restaurants.

History 
Restaurant Geranium was opened in the spring of 2007 in Kongens Have in Copenhagen by Rasmus Kofoed and Søren Ledet. Although the restaurant received a Michelin star in 2008, it was forced to close in 2009, but reopened in Parken, Østerbro in 2010.

In March 2013 the restaurant received two Michelin stars. In April same year it was named the world's 45th best restaurant by San Pellegrino's The World’s 50 best restaurants in 2013, which was an improvement of four positions, going from the 49th position. The restaurant kept the two Michelin stars for 2014. On February 24, 2016, Geranium was the first Danish restaurant to receive three Michelin stars. The Norwegian Michelin restaurant Maaemo also received three stars, which made these two restaurants the first Nordic restaurants to have three Michelin stars. In 2022, Geranium was named the world's best restaurant by San Pellegrino's list.

References

External links 
 
 Geranium.dk

Michelin Guide starred restaurants in Denmark
2007 establishments in Denmark
Restaurants in Copenhagen
Østerbro
Companies based in Copenhagen Municipality
Restaurants established in 2007